Nadia Petrova won the first edition of this tournament, defeating Shahar Pe'er 7–5, 6–2 in the final.

Seeds

Draw

Finals

Top half

Bottom half

Qualifying

Players

Seeds

Qualifiers

Qualifying draw

First qualifier

Second qualifier

Third qualifier

Fourth qualifier

References
 Qualifying Draw
Main Draw

Citi Open - Singles